The 2019 Victorian Football League season was the 138th season of the Victorian Football Association/Victorian Football League Australian rules football competition. The season ran from April 2019 until September 2019. The premiership was won by the Richmond reserves, after it defeated Williamstown in the Grand Final on 22 September 2019 by 3 points. It was the Richmond reserves team's first VFL premiership since entering the competition in 2014; and, the club's third VFA/VFL premiership overall including the two premierships won by its senior team in the early 1900s.

Ladder

Finals

Qualifying and Elimination Finals

Semi-finals

Preliminary Finals

Grand Final

Awards
 The J. J. Liston Trophy was won by Tom Gribble (Werribee), who polled 25 votes. Gribble finished ahead of Rhylee West (Footscray), who polled 17 votes, and Tom Campbell (North Melbourne), who polled 15 votes.
 The Frosty Miller Medal was won by Jordan Lisle (Port Melbourne), who kicked 40 goals during the home-and-away season, and 46 goals overall. It was Lisle's third medal, having previously won in 2017 and 2015.
 The Fothergill-Round-Mitchell Medal was won by Jake Riccardi (Werribee).

Notable events
 In 2019, the VFL announced new naming partners, with Hard Yakka and Totally Workwear joining as major sponsors.

See also 
 List of VFA/VFL premiers
 Australian rules football
 Victorian Football League
 Australian Football League
 2019 AFL season

References

External links
 Season results

Victorian Football League seasons
VFL